Norske Zinkprodukter was a manufacturing company in Oslo, Norway.

It was started in 1934 at Bryn, Oslo to produce the painting color zinc white, constituted by zinc oxide.

References

Manufacturing companies established in 1934
1934 establishments in Norway

Manufacturing companies based in Oslo
Defunct companies of Norway
Paint manufacturers